Naitou, l'orpheline (English: Naitou The Orphan) is a Guinean film directed by Moussa Kémoko Diakité, released in 1982. The film, based on a West African folktale, is unique in the fact that it is narrated musically by the Ballet National de Guinée.

Synopsis 
In a fit of jealousy, a woman poisons her co-wife. Not limiting herself to this one crime, she sets her sights on Naitou, the only daughter of the deceased. Eventually the "conscience" of the village, symbolized by an old woman, drives her crazy.

References

External links 
 

1982 films
Guinean drama films